The Migovec System is a  and  Alpine cave system within Mount Tolmin Migovec in the Municipality of Tolmin in northwestern Slovenia. The mountain and the cave system are part of Triglav National Park. The combined system is the longest known cave in the country, followed by the Postojna Cave System.

Entrances
The entrances include:
Chough Cave (M2), first explored in 1972, and the highest entrance to the system at 1861 m above sea level
M16, first explored in 1982
Torn T-Shirt  (M18), first explored in 1994
Gardeners' World, first explored in 2000
Fairy Cave, first explored in 2008
Primadona, first explored in 1999
Monatip, first explored in 2007

Exploration
The majority of exploration has been carried out by the Caving Section of the Tolmin Mountaineering Club, joined since 1994 by Imperial College Caving Club.

Primadona and Monatip, two entrances located on the Western cliff of the Migovec plateau form a cave that was first explored in 1999.

See also
List of caves in Slovenia

References

External links
Map of Registered Cave Entrances on Tolmin Migovec. Geopedia.si

Caves of the Slovene Littoral
Limestone caves
Municipality of Tolmin
2012 in Slovenia